In hydrology, stage refers to the water level in a river or stream with respect to a chosen reference height. Stage is important because direct measurements of river discharge are very difficult while water surface elevation measurements are comparatively easy. In order to convert stage into discharge, scientists can use a combination of tracer studies, observations of high water marks, numerical modeling, and/or satellite or aerial photography. The relationship between stage and discharge is called a rating curve.

See also
 Hydraulic head
 Stream gauge

Hydrology